Neil Perry was an American hardcore punk band from New Jersey, United States. Jon Marinari played bass and vocals in the influential New Jersey screamo band You and I. After they split, he and ex-members of Red All Over started Neil Perry.

Neil Perry released several records in the next four years, mostly with Level Plane records.
The band broke up in 2002. In early 2003 they recorded four new songs that were their final recordings and featured on their discography Lineage Situation, released by Level Plane records in July 2003. The release contained the band's entire 40 song discography, and a second disc included a 35-minute video of tour and live footage. Some of the new material had a post-rock structure to it.

After Neil Perry, band members played in other bands such as Hot Cross, Joshua Fit For Battle, A Life Once Lost, Superstitions of the Sky, The Now, Get Fucked, and Welcome the Plague Year.

Members
Josh Jakubowski - Vocals, Guitar
Chris Smith - Guitar, Vocals
Jon Marinari - Vocals, Bass
Justin Graves - Drums

Discography

Extended plays

Split releases

Compilation albums

Compilation appearances

References

External links
Neil Perry on Discogs
Official Neil Perry Website (Archived)

American screamo musical groups
Musical groups established in 1998
Hardcore punk groups from New Jersey
Level Plane Records artists